Juandré Kruger (born 6 September 1985) is a South African professional Rugby union footballer, contracted to Rugby Club Toulon in the French Top 14. His preferred position is at Lock although he has also played in the back row.

Career

Early provincial career in South Africa
He is widely regarded as one of the best up-and-coming second-row forward prospects in South African rugby. He started his career off at Western Province, representing them in the 2007 Vodacom Cup. From there he moved to Blue Bulls, competing for them in the 2008 Vodacom Cup. He also featured for the Blue Bulls in the 2008 Currie Cup, at times being preferred to Springbok internationals Victor Matfield and Bakkies Botha.

Northampton Saints
Kruger then made the move to Northampton Saints. He enjoyed a successful partnership with Carlos Ignacio Fernández Lobbe. In his first season at the club, he won the ECC. In his second and final season, he featured in the Heineken Cup, played in a Guinness Premiership Semi Final and won the Anglo-Welsh Cup.

Return to The Bulls
Kruger re-joined the Blue Bulls in 2010.

Racing Metro
In 2013 Kruger made the move with his family to Paris joining Top 14 club Racing 92

Springboks
On 2 June 2012, Juandré Kruger was called up to the Springbok squad for the first time for the inbound series against England. This was his first National selection. On 6 June, it was announced by Springbok coach Heyneke Meyer that Kruger would start at lock (number 5) for the first test of the series against England in Durban on 9 June 2012 . This would mark Kruger's debut for South Africa.
With South Africa running out 22-17 victors in the first test Kruger had made a good start to the series. He played all three matches. In the second game South Africa won 36-27 thanks to a late try from Pietersen but were held to a 14–14 draw in the final test.

Honours
 Racing 92
Top 14: 2015–16

References

External links
 
 
Northampton Profile
Bulls Profile
Racing Metro Profile

1985 births
Living people
South African rugby union players
South Africa international rugby union players
Rugby union players from Cape Town
Bulls (rugby union) players
Blue Bulls players
Northampton Saints players
Western Province (rugby union) players
Rugby union locks
Afrikaner people
Stellenbosch University alumni
Alumni of Paul Roos Gymnasium
Racing 92 players
RC Toulonnais players
Scarlets players